Chestnut Mountain is a mountain in the North Carolina High Country and wholly in the Pisgah National Forest.  Its elevation reaches 3,314 feet (1,010 m) and it also marks the corner between Avery, Burke, and Caldwell counties.  The mountain generates feeder streams for the Catawba River.

References

Mountains of North Carolina
Protected areas of Avery County, North Carolina
Protected areas of Burke County, North Carolina
Protected areas of Caldwell County, North Carolina
Pisgah National Forest
Mountains of Avery County, North Carolina
Mountains of Burke County, North Carolina
Mountains of Caldwell County, North Carolina